Michael H. Prosser, Professor Emeritus of the University of Virginia (1972-2001), was a Fulbright Professor at the University of Swaziland (1990–91), at which he initiated the communication major  and experienced a military invasion on November 14, 1990, where 2-4 students were killed and more than 300-400 were injured.  President of SIETAR International (1984–86), he later chaired six Rochester Intercultural Conferences  (1995-2001), and was series editor for 17 books in Civic Discourse for the Third Millennium for Ablex, Praeger and Greenwood Publishing Group (1998-2004).  A founder of the academic field of intercultural communication, he has been  editor/coeditor or author/coauthor of 20 books plus one special volume for the  International Journal of Intercultural Relations (2012: November).

Work
Prosser's books range from classical and medieval rhetoric, international public discourse, the United Nations, intercultural, international, and global  media to China, cross-cultural values, and social media. Five books have been published by Chinese presses. Prosser has been awarded honors in 2009 and 2011 by the Chinese Association for Intercultural Communication and in 2013 by the International Academy for Intercultural Research. He has been a keynoter at 15 conferences in China, India, Japan, and Russia. His book, The Cultural Dialogue (1978) has also been published in Japanese (1982) and Chinese (2013).The first in his current trilogy on social media is  Social Media in Asia (2014). Presently he is coediting Social Media in the Middle East to be published in 2016. The third volume will be Social Media in Africa planned for publication in 2018.

Prosser was a  Distinguished Visiting Professor in the School of Communication at Kent State University (1978) during the absence of D. Ray Heisey while he was president at Damavand College, Tehran, Iran and later as the William A. Kern Professor at the Rochester Institute of Technology (1994-2001). He was the academic advisor for lifelong learners and the Asian/intercultural specialist on the University of Virginia/Institute for Shipboard Learning on the autumn 2011 Semester at Sea around the world study voyage. He  has visited 69 countries including 11 in Asia. His later Chinese students began to call him a ChiAmerican because of his ten years of teaching 2550 students in China.

Intercultural communication career 
Prosser got his PhD from the University of Illinois in 1964 writing, his doctoral dissertation on the addresses of Ambassador Adlai E. Stevenson in the United Nations General Assembly, which later led to his editing of the international speeches of Stevenson and a two volume collection of addresses by heads of state and government in the General Assembly. He is a founder of the academic field of intercultural communicationin North America, and a participant in the field in China from 2001 to 2014. He is listed in the Marquis Who's Who in American Education, Who's Who in America, Who's Who in Asia, and Who's Who in the World. He served as President of the International Society of Intecultural  Education Training, and Research (1984–86), Founding President of the Rochester New York Fulbright Association (1995-1998),  President of the United Nations Association of Rochester New York  (1998–99), a member of the editorial board of the Journal of Middle Eastern and Islamic Studies (in Asia) (2007-2012), Chair of the International Advisory Board and Senior Coeditor for the Intercultural Research Series at the Intercultural Institute of Shanghai International Studies University (2006–present), Associate Editor of the Journal of Asian Religions (2014–present), and  he is a Fellow in the International Academy for Intercultural Research. Besides receiving honors from Ball State University and the International Communication Association in 1978, SIETAR International in 1986 and 1990, the China Association for Intercultural Communication in 2009 and 2011, and the International Academy for Intercultural Research  (2013), he has been awarded the 2015 Lifetime Achievement Award by the Academy which will be given to him at the biennial conference in Bergen, Norway, June 28-July 2, 2015.

In November, 2014, he gave a keynote address: "Social Media and Cybernetics in Asia: Implications for Regional Security" at the National University of Defense Technology International  Security Conference in Changsha, China, plus six lectures at the university, and three lectures at Central South University in Changsha during early December, 2014. As coeditor with Cui Litang of Tan Kha Kee College of Xiamen University of his social media trilogy, the first, Social Media in Asia (2014), and presently of  Social Media in the Middle East to be published in 2016 with Adil Nurmakov of KIMEP in Kazakhstan and Ehsan Shahghasemi of the University of Tehran, the third planned volume, Social Media in Africa, to be coedited with Debhasis (Deb) of the University of North Carolina at Chapel Hill, and to be published in 2018. All three books are being published by Dignity Press.

Selected publications
 Benson, T.W. & Prosser, M. H. (Eds.) (1969, 1972, 1985, 1989). Readings in Classical Rhetoric. Boston, MA: Allyn and Bacon. Bloomington, IN: Indiana University Press: Davis, CA: Hermagoras Press.  
Cui, L.T. & Prosser, M.H. (Eds.) (2014). Social Media in Asia, Lake Oswego, OR: Dignity Press. 
Donahue, R. T. & Prosser, M.H. (1997). Diplomatic Discourse: International Conflict at the United Nations, New York, NY: William Morrow.  (different edition)
Kulich, S. J. & Prosser, M. H. (Eds.) (2007). Intercultural Perspectives on Chinese Communication, Shanghai, China: Shanghai Foreign Language Education Press
Kulich, S.J., Prosser, M. H., & Weng, L.P. (Eds.) (2012). Value Frameworks at the Theoretical Crossroads of Culture, Vol. 4, Shanghai, China: Shanghai Foreign Language Education Press. 
Kulich, S. J., Weng, L. P., & Prosser, M.H. Value Dimensions and Their Contextual Dynamics across Cultures, Vol. 5,Shanghai, China: Shanghai Foreign Language Education Press.
Li, M. & Prosser, M.H. (2012). Communicating Interculturally, Beijing, China: Higher Education Press.
Li, M. & Prosser, M.H. (2014). Chinese Communicating Interculturally, Lake Oswego, OR: Dignity Press. .
Miller, J.M, Prosser, M.H., & Benson, T.W., (Eds.) (1973). Readings in Medieval Rhetoric. Bloomington, IN: Indiana University Press. 
Prosser, M. H. (Ed) (1969), An Ethic for Survival: Adlai Stevenson Speaks on International Issues, 1936–1965, New York, NY: William Morrow, Co. LCCN 69-11245
Prosser, M.H. (Ed.) (1970), Sow the Wind, Reap the Whirlwind: Heads of State Address the United Nations, two volumes, deluxe, boxed set, and numbered for the twenty-fifth anniversary of the United Nations, New York, NY: William Morrow, Co. LCCN 73-118271
Prosser, M. H. (Ed.) (1973), Intercommunication among Nations and Peoples, New York, NY: Harper and Row.  Press. 
Prosser, M. H. (1978), The Cultural Dialogue: An introduction to Intercultural Communication, Boston, MA: Houghton Mifflin Co., (1985, 1985, 1989). Washington, D.C.: SIETAR International; translated into Japanese by Roiche Okabe (1982). Tokyo, Japan: Tokai University Press. (2013). He Daokuan, Translated into Chinese. Beijing, China: Peking University Press.
Prosser, M.H. & Sitaram, K.S. (Eds.)(1999), Civic Discourse: Intercultural, International, and Global Media, Stamford, CT: Ablex Publishing Co. 
Prosser, M.H. (Ed.) (1978), Intercultural Communication Course: 1977 Proceedings, Washington, DC. International Communication Agency. (No ISBN number assigned)
Prosser, M.H. (forthcoming), Journey to the East: Asia in Focus, Lake Oswego, OR: Dignity Press. (ISBN number not yet assigned)
Prosser, M. H., Nurmakov, A., & Shahghasemi, E. (Eds.) (forthcoming). Social Media in the Middle East. Lake Oswego, OR: Dignity Press. (ISBN not yet assigned)
Prosser, M.H., Sharifzadeh, M., & Zhang, S. Y. (2013). Finding Cross-cultural Common Ground, Lake Oswego, OR: Dignity Press. 
Sitaram, K.S. & Prosser, M.H. (Eds.) (1998). Civic Discourse: Multiculturalism, Cultural Diversity, and Global Communication, Stamford, CT: Ablex Publishing Co. 
Zhou, S.L., Prosser, M.H., & Lu, J. (Coeds.). (2003). Sino-American Compositions on Shared Topics. Zheng Zhou, Chin: Henan People's Press.

References

External links
 "Complete Resume"
 
 "Being There", keynote address, IAiR Biennial Conference, Reno, Nevada, June 24, 2013

American non-fiction writers
Ball State University alumni
1936 births
Living people
University of Illinois alumni
University of Virginia faculty
Communication theorists